"Star People '97" is a song by British singer George Michael, released as the fifth single from his third studio album, Older (1996). It was written and performed by George Michael and was released by Virgin Records in the United Kingdom and DreamWorks Records in the United States. The lyrics make reference to the materialism and frivolity of certain (unspecified) people in show business, suggesting that those behaviours are derived from some insecurity or a bad childhood. The single version is titled "Star People '97", on most issues, because the track was re-recorded for the single release.

"Star People '97" was first released in the US on three formats over three weeks in March 1997 and was issued in the UK on 28 April 1997. The song peaked at  2 in the United Kingdom and No. 1 on the US Billboard Dance Club Songs chart, becoming Michael's second No. 1 on this chart. Worldwide, the song reached No. 1 in Denmark and Hungary, and reached the top 10 Iceland, Ireland, and Spain.

Critical reception
Matthew Hocter from Albumism noted that the song "spoke to the fakery and greed that consumes many in the entertainment business, making reference to damaging childhoods and insecurity as some of the possible causes." He described it as a song "rooted in a soul, funk sound with splashes of disco". Larry Flick from Billboard wrote, "After teasing his die-hard club following for months with several rhythmic (but not quite dance) singles, George Michael has finally unleashed a slamming house music anthem from his glorious—if underappreciated—opus "Older". Jeremy Healy, Amos, Mike Koglin, and Forthright have been tapped to turn the original retro pop/jazz ditty into a dance ditty. Working as a team, Healy, Amos, and Koglin successfully transform the song into an edgy anthem befitting the swagger of Michael's vocal. Meanwhile, Forthright injects a few drops of Europop flavor into the groove, making the single a viable top 40 contender. A sterling 12-inch package that was well worth the wait." 

A reviewer from Music Week rated it four out of five, adding, "The restrained Older track takes on a completely new life in this re-recorded, funked up version which amounts to George's brightest, most uplifting single in a long while." Ed Morales for Vibe opined that "the halfhearted condemnation of glitz in "Star People" has a serious Latin beat working."

Track listings

 UK and Australian CD1, Japanese CD single
 "Star People '97" – 5:42
 "Everything She Wants" (live from MTV Unplugged) – 4:37
 "Star People" (live from MTV Unplugged) – 6:01

 UK and Australian CD2
 "Star People '97" (Galaxy mix) – 8:05
 "Star People '97" (Forthright club mix) – 9:17
 "Star People '97" (Galaxy dub mix) – 7:14
 "Star People '97" (Forthright edit) – 4:28

 UK cassette single
 "Star People '97" (radio edit) – 4:39
 "Everything She Wants" (live from MTV Unplugged) – 4:37
 "Star People" (live from MTV Unplugged) – 6:01
 "Star People '97" (Forthright edit) – 4:28

 European CD single
 "Star People '97" – 5:42
 "Everything She Wants" (live from MTV Unplugged) – 4:37

 US CD and cassette single
 "Star People" (LP edit) – 4:11
 "Star People" (live from MTV Unplugged edit) – 4:31
 "Star People" (Forthright radio edit) – 4:28
 "The Strangest Thing" (live at the BBC Radio Theatre) – 6:01

 US maxi-CD and 12-inch single
 "Star People" (Forthright club mix) – 9:16
 "Star People" (Forthright dub mix) – 7:27
 "Star People" (Galaxy mix) – 8:08
 "Star People" (club dub mix) – 7:15
 "Star People" (live from MTV Unplugged edit) – 4:31
 "The Strangest Thing" (live at the BBC Radio Theatre) – 6:01

Charts

Weekly charts

Year-end charts

Certifications

Release history

References

1996 songs
1997 singles
British disco songs
British funk songs
British soul songs
DreamWorks Records singles
George Michael songs
Number-one singles in Denmark
Number-one singles in Hungary
Nu-disco songs
Song recordings produced by George Michael
Songs written by George Michael
Virgin Records singles